The 2014 municipal elections in Ontario were held on October 27, 2014.

Voters in the province of Ontario elected mayors, councillors, school board trustees and all other elected officials in all of the province's municipalities.

Electoral period
Submissions for candidate nominations were first accepted on 1 January 2014, at which time the campaign period began. The last day for acceptance of nominations or candidacy withdrawal was 12 September 2014.

From 1978 until 2006 the second Monday of November was the fixed date. Notwithstanding advance polling arrangements, municipal elections will be held on the fourth Monday of October, that is 27 October 2014.

The elected representatives will begin their council terms on 1 December 2014. Officials will serve a four-year term excepting death or resignation. All candidates must terminate their campaigning activity by 31 December 2014; this includes, for example, collecting electoral signs. They must file campaign financial details by 27 March 2015.

Single tier municipalities

Brant County

Brantford

Chatham-Kent

Greater Sudbury

Haldimand County

Hamilton

Kawartha Lakes

Norfolk County

Ottawa

Prince Edward County

Toronto

Counties

Bruce

Dufferin

Elgin

Essex

Frontenac

Grey

Haliburton

Hastings

Huron

Lambton

Lanark

Leeds and Grenville

Lennox and Addington

Middlesex

Northumberland

Perth

Peterborough

Prescott and Russell

Renfrew

Simcoe

Stormont, Dundas and Glengarry

Wellington

Regional municipalities

Durham

Halton

Muskoka District

Niagara

Oxford

Peel

Waterloo

York

Separated municipalities

Barrie

Belleville

Brockville

Cornwall

Gananoque

Guelph

London

In June 2014, mayor Joe Fontana resigned after being convicted for misusing government funds. On June 24, Council appointed Joni Baechler as mayor for the remainder of the current term.

Kingston

Orillia

Pembroke

Peterborough

Prescott

Quinte West

Smiths Falls

Stratford

St. Marys

St. Thomas

Windsor

Districts

Algoma District

Cochrane District

Kenora District

Manitoulin District

Nipissing District

Parry Sound District

Rainy River District

Sudbury District

Thunder Bay District

Timiskaming District

Term lengths

The Legislative Assembly of Ontario legislation (Bill 81, Schedule H), passed in 2006, sets the length of terms in office for all municipal elected officials at four years.

References

 
2014 elections in Canada